The Bellanca 19-25 Skyrocket II was a prototype light airplane built in the United States in the 1970s.  Despite its advanced design and exceptionally good performance, it never achieved certification or entered production.

Development 
The aircraft was the result of Giuseppe Bellanca's son, August Thomas Bellanca. Bellanca formed Bellanca Aircraft Engineering Inc. company in Scott Depot, West Virginia to develop a new design conceived in 1957.  The Skyrocket II was a six-seat, low-wing cantilever monoplane of conventional layout with retractable tricycle landing gear.  It was made of composite materials, an advanced feature for its time, and test flying proved it to be fast. In 1975, within months of its first flight, the prototype claimed five world airspeed records for piston aircraft in its class. Three still stand in 2022:

Class C-1c (takeoff weight 1000 to 1750 kg): average 296 miles/hour on a 500-km circuit

Class C-1d (weight 1750 to 3000 kg): average 326 mph on a 500-km circuit and 314 mph on a 1000-km circuit

The aircraft attracted the attention of NASA, which conducted an aerodynamic analysis of the design, investigating natural laminar flow as a factor of its high performance.

Plans to produce the aircraft commercially were scrapped due to the downturn in the civil aviation market in the United States in the early 1980s. In the mid-1990s, the design was developed into a kit and sold as the Skyrocket III to help fund a new certification programme. The Skyrocket III features greater speed, payload and range and was re-engineered for modular construction. By 1998 eleven kits had been delivered, but it is uncertain if any were completed and flown.

Surviving aircraft 
The prototype Skyrocket II is owned by the Delaware Aviation Museum in Georgetown, Delaware.

Specifications (Skyrocket II)

References

 
 
 "Bellanca SkyRocket back on launch pad" Flight International April 12, 1996.
 Wynbrandt, James. "AviaBellanca SkyRocket gets Orenda power" General Aviation News August 7, 1998.
 manufacturer's website
 Fédération Aéronautique Internationale records page for this aircraft
 Summary of NASA test programme

Skyrocket II
1970s United States civil utility aircraft
Low-wing aircraft
Single-engined tractor aircraft
Aircraft first flown in 1975